The 2005 FIM Sidecarcross world championship, the 26th edition of the competition, started on 17 April and finished after eleven race weekends on 18 September 2005 with Daniël Willemsen taking out the title once more.

Overview
The 2005 season was the 26th edition of the sidecarcross world championship. It resulted in a fourth world championship for Daniël Willemsen, his third in a row and his first with his passenger Sven Verbrugge from Belgium. The runners-up spot went to Kristers Sergis / Kaspars Stupelis who had a good start to the season and lead the classement in the early stages, the five-time world champion Sergis improving on last seasons disappointing seventh place. Third place also went to Latvia with Maris Rupeiks / Haralds Kurpnieks but the two were never in the race for the championship. Except for the top two, no other team managed to win a race this season.

The eleven races of the season were held in eight countries, Spain, Croatia, Bulgaria, Netherlands, France (2x), Germany (2x), Belgium and Latvia (2x).

Format
Every Grand Prix weekend is split into two races, both held on the same day. This means, the 2005 season with its eleven Grand Prix had twentytwo races. Each race was 30 minutes plus 2 rounds long.

Teams go through a qualifying, usually on Saturday. Typically, around 50 teams compete for 30 spots on the starting grid, meaning around 20 teams miss out on the race altogether. Some teams did not actually get a race start all season, failing in qualifying each time.

Teams consist of a driver and a passenger, however, the drivers can and do exchange passengers during the season, often due to injury. An exchange of passenger does not affect the points a team has won up till then. Driver and passenger do not have to be from the same country either.

The first twenty teams of each race scored competition points, allocated accordingly to the following system:

Calendar
The 2005 season had eleven Grand Prix:

 The Sidecarcross des Nations in Jauer on 25 September 2005 is a non-championship event but part of the calendar and is denoted by a light blue background in the table above.
 Passengers in italics.

Classification

Riders
The final standings in the overall table of the 2005 season were:

 Equipment listed is motor and frame.
 Some drivers used more than one passenger during the season. Where there are more than one passenger shown, they are in the order of races they have taken part in with this driver.

References

External links
 The World Championship on Sidecarcross.com
 The John Davey Grand Prix Pages – Results of all GP's up until 2005
 FIM Sidecar Motocross World Championship 2010

Sidecarcross world championship, 2005
Sidecarcross World Championship seasons